Alan Douglas Edward Cameron,  (13 March 1938 – 31 July 2017) was a British classicist and academic. He was Charles Anthon Professor Emeritus of the Latin Language and Literature at Columbia University, New York.  He was one of the leading scholars of the literature and history of the later Roman world and at the same time a wide-ranging classical philologist whose work encompassed above all the Greek and Latin poetic tradition from Hellenistic to Byzantine times but also aspects of late antique art.

Life
He was educated at St. Paul's School, London (1951–56). He went on to New College, Oxford, earning a first class in Honour Moderations (1959) and Literae Humaniores (1961). He was married, from 1962 to 1980, to Dame Averil Cameron, with whom he has a son and a daughter. In 1998 he married Carla Asher, who survives him.

Cameron began his academic career as a Lecturer at the University of Glasgow (1961). He then became a Lecturer and then a Reader in Latin at Bedford College, London (1964-1972). From 1972 to 1977 he held the Chair of Latin at King's College London. He went to Columbia University as Charles Anthon Professor in 1977.

Cameron was elected a Fellow of the British Academy (FBA) in 1975. He became a Fellow of the American Academy of Arts and Sciences in 1978 and a Fellow of the American Philosophical Society in 1992. In March 1997 he was awarded the American Philological Association's Goodwin Award. In 2005, he received Columbia University's Lionel Trilling Award.

In 2013, he was awarded the Kenyon Medal for Classical Studies and Archaeology of the British Academy.  The award dedication read as follows:

Cameron also published about 200 scholarly articles on a wide range of subjects related to the ancient world.

He died on 31 July 2017 in New York.

Selected works
Cameron's books include:
 Claudian: Poetry and Propaganda at the Court of Honorius (1970)
 Porphyrius the Charioteer (1973)
 Circus Factions: Blues and Greens at Rome and Byzantium (1976)
 Barbarians and Politics at the Court of Arcadius (May 1992) (with Jacqueline Long and Lee Sherry)
 The Greek Anthology: From Meleager to Planudes (1993)
 Callimachus and his Critics (1995)
 Greek Mythography in the Roman World (2004)  (reviewed by T P Wiseman in the Times Literary Supplement,  13 May 2005 page 29)
 The Last Pagans of Rome (2011) (reviewed by Peter Brown in the New York Review of Books, 7 April 2011)
 Wandering Poets and Other Essays in Late Antique Poetry and Philosophy (2015).

References

External links

British classical scholars
Columbia University faculty
1938 births
2017 deaths
Fellows of the British Academy
British Byzantinists
Classical scholars of Columbia University
Classical philologists
Scholars of Byzantine history
Scholars of Byzantine literature